Michael Jones (born June 25, 1985) is a former American football guard. He was signed by the San Diego Chargers as an undrafted free agent in 2007. He played college football at Iowa.

Jones has also been a member of the Chicago Bears and Minnesota Vikings. Currently Mike Jones is the offensive coordinator at Addison Trail High School, where he also teaches.

External links
Iowa Hawkeyes bio

1985 births
Living people
Sportspeople from Cook County, Illinois
American football offensive guards
Iowa Hawkeyes football players
San Diego Chargers players
Chicago Bears players